Middlegame is a 2019 science fantasy/horror novel by Seanan McGuire. It was well-received critically, winning the 2020 Locus Award for Best Fantasy Novel and garnering a nomination for the 2020 Hugo Award for Best Novel.

A companion novel, Seasonal Fears, was released in 2022. The series is also related to The Up-and-Under series, written by McGuire under the pen name A. Deborah Baker.

Plot

Alchemist James Reed attempts to create a human embodiment of the Doctrine of Ethos, a fundamental force of the universe. He creates twins Roger and Dodger, child prodigies with mastery over language and mathematics, respectively. The twins forge an intermittent psychic connection as children. The pair reunite in person at Berkeley for grad school. Erin, another construct created by Reed, is Dodger’s roommate. Erin is secretly following Reed’s orders, but resents him for killing her twin brother Darren.

When Roger visits home for Thanksgiving, he finds a childhood drawing of him and Dodger which should not exist. Erin instructs him to reset the timeline. Dodger uses her powers to bring them back in time, erasing all memories of the event. It is revealed that Roger and Dodger have used their powers to reset the timeline thousands of times before, preventing Reed from destroying them. The twins explore their powers, accidentally triggering a massive earthquake which destroys much of Berkeley. Horrified, Roger abandons his sister.

Years later, Roger is a professor who is dating Erin. Reed orders Erin to kill Roger. Erin goes rogue and helps Roger escape. Timelines begin to merge as Roger and Dodger speak to each other from their alternate pasts and futures. Roger and Dodger reunite once again at the Sutro Baths, exploring their reality-warping powers. Dodger is shot and almost dies. Erin and Reed are both killed in a final confrontation. Roger and Dodger decide to learn more about their powers, and agree that they will eventually try once more to find a timeline with a happier ending.

Background

In an interview with the Los Angeles Public Library, McGuire stated that Middlegame was inspired by the song Doctrine of Ethos by Dr. Mary Crowell. In an interview with Den of Geek, McGuire stated she was inspired by the Pythagorean philosophy idea that the universe is entirely made up of math and language. She wanted to explore the idea of "embodying cosmic forces" in order to "make them more relatable".

Reception

Middlegame won the 2020 Locus Award for Best Fantasy Novel, and was a finalist for the 2020 Hugo Award for Best Novel. Paste called it "clever and imaginative", with "memorably menacing" antagonists, and compared it to the work of Lev Grossman. National Public Radio considered Reed to be "a little flat", and further described him and his assistant Leigh as "mustache-twisting caricatures driven by non-specific hate and vengeance and not exactly, you know, rounded," but overall praised the book's "complicated structure that demands some fairly close reading", noting that due to "McGuire's skills (...) it never actually feels all that complicated." Publishers Weekly lauded it as "genuinely innovative", "mesmerizing", and the work of "an author of consummate skill", emphasizing that the story's mutable timeline "demand(s) close attention from readers". Kirkus Reviews described it as "thrilling, emotionally resonant, and cerebral", and "Escape to Witch Mountain for grownups", but observed that "it isn't clear" how Reed's plan was intended to work, nor why his followers believe he would share power with them.

The companion novel Seasonal Fears also received a positive critical response. Publishers Weekly praised Harry and Melanie's relationship, writing that the work was a "worthy, highly intelligent, wholly satisfying expansion of the Middlegame mythos".

Related works
Middlegame contains several excerpts from Over the Woodward Wall, a fictitious children's novel purportedly written by the equally-fictitious 19th-century alchemist A. Deborah Baker; a complete version of Over the Woodward Wall (written by McGuire) was published in October 2020. This first novel in The Up-and-Under series has been followed by Along the Saltwise Sea, and a third novel entitled Into the Windwracked Wilds is scheduled for publication in October 2022.

Seasonal Fears, a second novel set in the world of Middlegame, was published in 2022. McGuire has stated that she would eventually like to write five novels in the Alchemical Journeys series, with each one related to one of the five alchemical elements. Middlegame, Seasonal Fears, Tidal Creatures, Ink Pot Gods, and an untitled fifth book would represent Fire, Earth, Water, Air, and Aether, respectively.

References

2019 American novels
American fantasy novels
Novels by Seanan McGuire
Tor Books books